Vriesea ruschii is a plant species in the genus Vriesea. This species is endemic to Brazil.

References

ruschii
Flora of Brazil